78-87 London Youth is a 2012 photography book by British photographer Derek Ridgers.

Synopsis
The book is a collection of photographs of young Londoners taken by the photographer from 1978-1988. It especially focuses on the alternative youth scene from punk through to the birth of acid house music. It showcases the creativity and individuality of the young.

Reception
In The Observer Sean O'Hagan described the work as a "visual anthropology of a bygone era"  and wrote that  "hopefully this is only the first instalment in a much bigger series devoted to Ridgers's invaluable archive of London youth culture in these decades" 
The work was also reviewed in  The Daily Telegraph

References

2013 non-fiction books
Books about London
Books of photographs
Youth culture in the United Kingdom
Skinhead
Punk literature